Nizhegorodsky (masculine), Nizhegorodskaya (feminine), or Nizhegorodskoye (neuter) may refer to:
Nizhegorodsky District, name of several districts and city districts in Russia
Nizhny Novgorod Oblast (Nizhegorodskaya oblast), a federal subject of Russia
Nizhegorodskaya (rural locality), a rural locality (a stanitsa) in Krasnodar Krai, Russia
Nizhegorodskaya (Moscow Metro), a station on the Moscow Metro
Nizhegorodskaya (Moscow Central Circle), a station on the Moscow Railway
Nizhegorodskaya railway station, on the Gorkovsky suburban railway line in Moscow
Nizhegorodsky (family), a princely family of Rurikid stock
48th Nizhegorodsky Reconnaissance Regiment, air unit of the Soviet Air Forces

See also
 Nizhny Novgorod